Eniko Kubinyi (born 1 August 1976) is a Hungarian biologist who studies cognition in pet dogs. She completed her Ph.D. degree in animal behaviour from the Faculty of Sciences of the Eotvos Lorand University, where she is the principal investigator of the Senior Family Dog Project and the Canine Brain and Tissue Bank.

In 2012 she appeared on the Horizon (BBC TV series) programme The Secret Life of the Dog. She is a fellow of the Young Academy of Europe and a founding member of the Hungarian Young Academy.

Bibliography

Books 
Author of 10 chapters The Dog - A Natural History

References

External links 
 Young Academy of Europe
 Department of Ethology Eotvos Lorand University profile
 

Academic staff of Eötvös Loránd University
Ethologists
Hungarian biologists
Living people
1976 births